Vladimir Krivtsov (born 23 March 1952) is a retired Russian swimmer who won a silver in the 4 × 100 m freestyle relay at the 1973 World Aquatics Championships. He also competed in the 100 m butterfly event at the 1972 Summer Olympics, but did not reach the finals. In 1975, his was part of the teams that set European records in the 4 × 100 m and 4 × 200 m freestyle relays.

References

1952 births
Living people
Soviet male swimmers
Swimmers at the 1972 Summer Olympics
Olympic swimmers of the Soviet Union
World Aquatics Championships medalists in swimming
Universiade medalists in swimming
Universiade gold medalists for the Soviet Union